Minibraria is a genus of sea snails, marine gastropod mollusks in the family Colubrariidae.

Species
Species within the genus Minibraria include:

 Minibraria monroei (McGinty, 1962)

References

Colubrariidae
Monotypic gastropod genera